This is an incomplete list of AM broadcast (medium wave) radio transmitter stations in Australia, past and present.

History
See also main article History of broadcasting in Australia

The amateur years
In the 1920s transmission on the medium wave band was dominated by amateurs who after qualifying by means of an examination and displaying proficiency in Morse code communication (though the band was restricted to telephony), were issued with a call sign consisting of a number denoting for which State the licence was issued (2=NSW, 3=Vic; 4=Qld; 5=SA and NT; 6=WA; 7=Tas) and a two-letter suffix of their own choosing. A licence fee was paid to the Postmaster General's Department, renewable every five years. 
Amateurs generally designed and built their own equipment.
One such amateur was Tom Elliot, who in 1921 established station 4CM for its owner Dr. McDowall. This would be part of the impetus behind the Queensland Government establishing 4QG, Australia's first Government-owned station.

Another noted pioneer was Charles "Charlie" Maclurcan, whose station 2CM made many distance records on long and short wave, but apparently never experimented with medium wave, the subject of this article.

Radio receivers were also the province of enthusiasts, who were required to own a listener's licence. Much interest revolved around reception of distant signals ("DX" in the amateurs' terminology) and much valuable experience in the vagaries of radio propagation was gained by the listeners, many of whom collected "QSL" cards — acknowledgement of a confirmed reception by the transmitting station.

Program material was supplied by the amateur, and included talks, recitations, readings from books and newspapers, and live or recorded music (in those days no copyright fees were payable). Broadcast times may have been for only a few hours a day and a few days a week.

Commercialization
In August 1923 laws were passed after an American model, as recommended by Ernest Fisk, by which "Sealed Set" receivers were built to receive a single frequency, that of the issuing company, whose income depended on sale or rental of these receivers, a situation analogous to Pay-TV services today. In the early days of the tuned radio-frequency receiver the simplicity of a "sealed set" would have been seen as a great convenience. 
Amateur constructors were however able to build tuneable (or "open") receivers and thereby gain a wider range of entertainment without fee.

This situation could not endure, and in mid-1924 "open" sets became legal, but subject to an annual "broadcast listener's licence", the fees of which would be apportioned to "A-class" broadcasters.
Among the six licences granted under the "sealed set" regime were several (5MA in Adelaide and 3FC in Melbourne) which were unable to adapt to the changes and failed commercially. Perhaps significantly, the transmitters of both stations mentioned were on long wavelengths (850 m. and 1720 m. respectively) unable to be picked up by ordinary medium-wave receivers. The others were granted "A-class" licences. 2FC was also on a long wavelength (1100 m) but converted to 442 metres.
As originally legislated, "A-class" broadcasters' licences were issued to broadcasters who undertook to:
Install a transmitter of 5 kW power rating to a standard approved by, and on a frequency allocated by, the Postmaster General (PMG).
Make a deposit of £1000 with the PMG and organise a surety of a further £1000 from an approved stakeholder
Run regular programmes of general interest to the satisfaction of the PMG.
The "A-class" broadcaster was permitted to run advertisements of no longer than 5 minutes duration and no more than 60 minutes in any 12-hour period.
The number of "A-class" stations in New South Wales and Victoria was limited to two each, and one to each of the other States.
"B-class" stations were not encumbered by the same regulations. They received no part of the listeners' licences, but were permitted to fund their operations through advertising.
In 1925 a domestic broadcast listener's licence cost £1/15/-, of which the broadcasting station received £1/10/-. It did not entitle the holder to disseminate information or programmes (that required permission from the broadcaster), nor to amplify the audio for the benefit of customers, as in a barber shop or hotel. That required payment of a further £10/- fee. Radio dealers were prohibited from installing loudspeakers outside the shop's radio department.
Collections for the year 1924/25 amounted to around £114,000 which was apportioned:
2FC: £35,000 | 2BL: £12,000
3LO: £14,000 | 3AR: £4,000
6WF: £4,000; the balance being retained by the Government.
By 1932 the fee had been reduced to £1/4/-.
The broadcast listener's licence in 1962 cost £2/15/- per annum, per household, and the Television Licence was £5 (£1/5/- for pensioners and blind people). It was a bothersome licence to renew, requiring a trip to a Post Office; difficult to enforce, as evasions could only be detected while a set was in use, and expensive to prosecute. In 1974 these licences were abolished by the reformist Whitlam government.

In the late 1920s amateurs were slowly displaced by professional organizations holding "A-class" or "B-class" licences, many of which were a continuation or development of an amateur operation. Amateurs were then obliged to pursue their hobby on higher frequency "amateur" bands.

National Broadcasting Service
The takeover by the Commonwealth Government of "A Class" broadcasters began in 1928 when the Australian Broadcasting Company Ltd. (founded 1926 with a capital of £100,000) won a Government contract to provide programming nationwide for the "A-class" stations in each State: 2FC Sydney and 3AR Melbourne in 1929, 4QG in Brisbane in 1930, 5CL in Adelaide 1929, and 6WF in Perth. 
The Postmaster General's Department took over responsibility for provision, maintenance and operation of technical facilities of their studios and transmitters, giving the Government an ultimate veto over ABC broadcasts, a situation which would endure until the 1980s.
Most of the commercial and ABC broadcast transmitters were manufactured and installed by either Amalgamated Wireless (Australasia) (AWA) or Standard Telephones and Cables (STC), with one or two by Scott and Co., of Sydney.

The Australian Broadcasting Company became the Australian Broadcasting Commission in July 1932, with stations 2FC, 2BL, 2NC, 2CO, 3LO, 3AR, 4QG, 4RK, 5CL, 5CK, 6WP and 7ZL forming a national system with six capital city stations and four regional stations forming one network, and 2BL and 3LO the foundation of what would become a second network.

In October 1937 the roles of the two arms of the NBS were reversed in Sydney and Melbourne: 2BL took over the No 1 National programme from 2FC; 3AR from 3LO, and the newly commissioned 5AN from 5CL.

AM stereo

In the late 1950s, before stereophonic record players became commonplace, and long before FM-stereo broadcasting, some stations (notably 3XY and 3UZ, but also 2CN and 2CY) partnered to present stereophonic programmes, one station to each channel, so the listener could set up a pair of radios and experience the stereo effect. The experiment ceased after a few months.
In the mid-1980s some operators, including capital-city ABC stations, elected to have stereo modulation (to the Motorola C-QUAM standard) implemented on their transmitters. The system made no noticeable difference on standard radios, but was very effective on a compatible AM stereo receiver. Few of these (rather expensive) receivers were sold, and the networks abandoned the experiment without fanfare. As at September 2020 the only AM station still broadcasting in AM stereo is 4WK (963kHz).

Frequency assignment
By convention, a broadcaster's "spot on the dial" was originally defined in terms of wavelength (in metres), then from around 1940 increasingly by frequency, which was more precise, as all stations were by then crystal controlled to an accurate multiple of 5 kHz (or kilocycles per second in the terminology of the time).A sufficiently accurate formula for converting wavelength to frequency is: f (in kHz) = 300,000 / λ (in metres)
In the early days the band was shared between "Class B" operators who operated on a defined wavelength and schedule, and licensed amateurs, who broadcast sporadically, and tried to transmit at a wavelength where risk of interference was minimized. In those days superheterodyne receivers were prohibitively expensive for most listeners; more common were crystal sets, regenerative or tuned radio frequency receivers, which had poor adjacent-channel rejection.
Around 1930 a number of stations changed their operating frequencies, apparently independently and no doubt for good, though not published, reasons.
A major program of frequency changes, imposed on broadcasters by the Post Master General, came into operation on 1 September 1935 following the licensing of another seven "B class" stations. Some were to standardize all frequencies to a multiple of 10 kcs/sec (10 kHz); some to resolve technical problems such as interference from nearby transmitters (in some cases from New Zealand), and a few in an effort to aggregate "A class" stations to the low-frequency (long wavelength) end of the dial, though there remained many exceptions to this policy.

Another reshuffle occurred in June 1948, when 24 stations were subjected to a changed frequency allocation. The reason given was increased power output of various New Zealand transmitters.

As a result of the Geneva Frequency Plan of 1975, on 23 November 1978 all broadcast stations moved to new frequencies on the basis of a 9 kHz "raster", thereby freeing up the crowded AM band by some ten percent. In the following decades many broadcasters moved to the FM band, trading long distance reception for less expensive transmission equipment and clearer sound. Most ABC AM stations continued to operate in the face of a burgeoning variety of competing media (FM, DAB+, podcasts ...) in the interests of universal coverage, but a great many commercial stations closed or turned to FM, and some transmitters were turned over to niche broadcasters (Radio for the Print Handicapped, ethnic radio, University radio, racing, News Radio). A later development was the provision of small AM repeater stations, both National and commercial, at a different frequency but bearing the same call sign as the primary transmitter.

This list does not include the many Australian Community radio Broadcasters except as they relate to National or Commercial broadcasters, and with a few exceptions ignores studios, programme material, personalities, networks, branding, slogans, and target audience.

Legend
Type A = Government funded (including SBS radio). B = self funded (now called "commercial" but historic term retained here)
Fate Frequency if currently active, otherwise B = Broadcasts still occurring from same location and frequency but call sign changed; C = Licence cancelled or lapsed (may be followed by date); F = Moved to FM band (may be followed by date) ; D = Continues to broadcast using DAB+ only (may be followed by a date).

Overseas broadcasters during World War II
A large number of AM radio stations were established by Australian and US forces in bases to the north of Australia in the years 1943–1946, of which around 20 were operated by the Australian Army Amenities Service. This is an incomplete list of those overseas broadcasters whose callsign commenced with "9". 9AT in Kure, Japan operated during the post-war occupation period.

See also
History of broadcasting in Australia
List of radio stations in Australia
Timeline of Australian radio

References

External links 
Radio Heritage: AM Radio ACT
Radio Heritage: AM Radio NSW
Radio Heritage: AM Radio Vic
Radio Heritage: AM Radio Qld
Radio Heritage: AM Radio SA
Radio Heritage: AM Radio WA
Radio Heritage: AM Radio Tas
Radio Heritage: AM Radio NT
Radio Heritage: AM/FM AM & FM Radio Australian Territories
Radio and television broadcasting stations Internet edition JANUARY 2020 – ACMA
Wikibook – History of wireless telegraphy and broadcasting in Australia/Topical/Publications/Australian Radio History/NSW AM Stations

Broadcasting in Australia
Radio stations in Australia
Australian